Enteromius wellmani is a species of ray-finned fish in the genus Enteromius which is only found in the upper reaches of the Cuvo River system in Angola.

References 

 

Endemic fauna of Angola
Enteromius
Taxa named by George Albert Boulenger
Fish described in 1911